Tal Khalvati-ye Qader Rahman (also Romanized as Tal Khalvatī-ye Qāder Raḩmān) is a village in Posht Tang Rural District, in the Central District of Sarpol-e Zahab County, Kermanshah Province, Iran. At the 2006 census, its population was 73, in 16 families.

References 

Populated places in Sarpol-e Zahab County